Frank T.O. Walker (October 6, 1878 – October 29, 1904) was a private in the United States Army and a Medal of Honor recipient for his actions in the Philippine–American War.

Medal of Honor citation
Rank and organization. Private, Company F, 46th Infantry, U.S. Volunteers. Place and date: Near Taal, Luzon, Philippine Islands, January 18, 1900. Entered service at: Burlington, Mass. Birth: South Boston, Mass. Date of issue: March 11, 1902.

Citation:

Under heavy fire of the enemy he rescued a dying comrade who was sinking beneath the water.

See also

List of Philippine–American War Medal of Honor recipients

References

External links
 

1878 births
1904 deaths
United States Army Medal of Honor recipients
United States Army soldiers
People from Boston
American military personnel of the Philippine–American War
Philippine–American War recipients of the Medal of Honor